Ribosomal protein S6 kinase delta-1 is an enzyme that in humans is encoded by the RPS6KC1 gene.

References

Further reading

EC 2.7.11